Al Muqabalayn is a town in the Amman Governorate of north-western Jordan. It is also a district  of the Amman governorate.

References

Populated places in Amman Governorate
Districts of Jordan